Rodrigo Julián Holgado (born 28 June 1995) is an Argentine footballer who plays as a forward for Curicó Unido, on loan from Gimnasia La Plata.

References

External links

1995 births
Living people
Argentine footballers
Argentine expatriate footballers
Association football forwards
San Lorenzo de Almagro footballers
Club Almagro players
Albinegros de Orizaba footballers
C.D. Veracruz footballers
Coquimbo Unido footballers
Audax Italiano footballers
Club de Gimnasia y Esgrima La Plata footballers
Curicó Unido footballers
Liga MX players
Primera B de Chile players
Argentine expatriate sportspeople in Chile
Argentine expatriate sportspeople in Mexico
Expatriate footballers in Chile
Expatriate footballers in Mexico
Sportspeople from Buenos Aires Province